Mioko may refer to:

, Japanese singer-songwriter
Mioko Fujiwara
Mioko Island, part of the Duke of York Islands.

Japanese feminine given names